Palestine Independent School District is a public school district based in Palestine, Texas (USA) that serves approximately 3,500 students in central Anderson County.

In 2009, the school district was rated "academically acceptable" by the Texas Education Agency.

Schools
Palestine High School (Grades 9–12)
Palestine Junior High (Grades 7–8)
A. M. Story Elementary School (Grades 4-6)
Southside Elementary School (Grades 2-3)
Northside Primary School (Grades K-1)
Washington Early Childhood Center (EE, PK)

Students

Ethnicity
Students during the 2006–2007 school year:
 Total: 3,405 (100.0%)
 White: 1,311 (38.5%)
 Hispanic: 1,062 (31.2%)
 African American: 996 (29.3%)
 Asian/Pacific Islander: 30 (0.9%)
 Native American: 6 (0.2%)

Grade level
Students during the 2006–2007 school year:
 Early Childhood Education and Pre-Kindergarten: 181 (5.3%)
 Elementary (K-5): 1,579 (46.4%)
 Middle School (6–8): 720 (21.1%)
 High School (9–12): 925 (27.2%)
 Class of 2006 Graduates: 187

Other statistics
 Economically Disadvantaged (2006–2007): 65.1% (2,217)
 Annual Dropout Rate, Grades 7–12 (2005–2006): 3.1%
 Average SAT Score (Class of 2006): 1013
 Average ACT Score (Class of 2006): 21.2

Leadership
Palestine ISD is led by a superintendent chosen by the Board of Trustees.  The board named Dr. Thomas A. Wallis, former principal of Mabank High School, as superintendent beginning in the 2008–2009 school year.

Board of Trustees
Mr. Michael Bennett, President
Mr. Ricky Ferguson, Vice President
Rev. Wade Hobbs, Secretary
Mr. Chuck Grissaffi
Ms. Dana Staples
Ms. Janie Sepulveda
Ms. Dyna Tutt

References

External links

School districts in Anderson County, Texas
Palestine, Texas